Czaplice may refer to the following places:
Czaplice, Podlaskie Voivodeship (north-east Poland)
Czaplice, Gryfice County in West Pomeranian Voivodeship (north-west Poland)
Czaplice, Wałcz County in West Pomeranian Voivodeship (north-west Poland)